The women's triple jump at the 2021 World Athletics U20 Championships was held at the Kasarani Stadium on 19 and 20 August.

Records

Results

Qualification
The qualification took place on 19 August, in two groups, starting at 17:00. Athletes attaining a mark of at least 13.20 metres ( Q ) or at least the 12 best performers ( q ) qualified for the final.

Final
The final was held on 20 August at 14:27.

References

Triple jump
Triple jump at the World Athletics U20 Championships
U20